Sophia Serseri (born 1 December 1995) is a French gymnast. She competed for the national team at the 2012 Summer Olympics in the Women's artistic team all-around.

References

French female artistic gymnasts
1995 births
Living people
Olympic gymnasts of France
Gymnasts at the 2012 Summer Olympics
Gymnasts at the 2010 Summer Youth Olympics
21st-century French women